Joseph W. Catharine School is a historic elementary school located in the Mount Moriah neighborhood of Philadelphia, Pennsylvania. It is part of the School District of Philadelphia. The building was designed by Irwin T. Catharine and built in 1937–1938. It is a three-story, six bay, yellow brick in the Moderne-style. It features a main entrance with decorative stone surround, stone sills, and stone coping atop the building.

The building was added to the National Register of Historic Places in 1988.

References

External links

School buildings on the National Register of Historic Places in Philadelphia
Moderne architecture in Pennsylvania
School buildings completed in 1938
School District of Philadelphia
Southwest Philadelphia
Public elementary schools in Philadelphia